Bailey Gate railway station was on the Somerset & Dorset Joint Railway in the English county of Dorset.

Usage
The station served the United Dairies cheese factory and the village of Sturminster Marshall but was named after a local farm to avoid confusion with another station on the same railway at Sturminster Newton.

The station had extensive sidings and was one of the largest depots for transporting milk on the UK railway system. Milk was carried in tanker wagons from Bailey Gate to London and was a major source of revenue for the railway. Sugar beet was also loaded onto wagons for transportation to refineries.

Buildings
The station consisted of three buildings, a Waiting Room/Ticket Office, a small shed for the lamps on the downside and a signalbox on the upside, behind the station were the sidings for transhipment. Access to the station from the west was via a small path that ran down from the slope of the bridge, which took the user to the up platform where, to gain access to the station buildings, one had to cross the railway lines via a small wooden crossing next to the bridge. Access from the east was via the main entrance to the goods sidings down the slope and around the side of the station via a gateway.

Closure
The station closed with the railway under the Beeching Axe in March 1966. Track was finally lifted in 1969, as the railway remained open until the closure of the goods terminal at Blandford that year.

There is now an industrial estate off the A350 road called "Bailie Gate" at the site.

References

Bibliography

External links
 Bailey Gate Station map Ordnance Survey

Disused railway stations in Dorset
Former Somerset and Dorset Joint Railway stations
Railway stations in Great Britain opened in 1860
Railway stations in Great Britain closed in 1966
Beeching closures in England